The Best of Atomic Rooster Volumes 1 & 2 is a double compilation album by British rock band Atomic Rooster.

It is unofficial and unlicensed; like numerous other such collections, it consists mostly of latter-era, John Du Cann-penned recordings. It was, however, made without any involvement from Du Cann, nor has he ever received any royalties from its sales.

It is particularly notable for the fact that, besides being more representative of that era than similar compilations, it also contains a quantity of previously unissued recordings, of great interest to keen collectors of the band.

It has been issued on at least three separate occasions; the first time was in 1992 on Saraja Records, a subsidiary of Satellite Music Ltd. Satellite Music is owned by Ray Dorset, of Mungo Jerry fame.

As this is only a semi-official release, it could be considered a bootleg of sorts; indeed it has itself been bootlegged twice:

It was repackaged, retitled The Millennium Collection and re-released in 1999 by Digimode Entertainment Ltd.
Secondly, in 2000 it was repackaged yet again, retitled simply Anthology and released on the Double Classics/Delta Music label.

Both latter versions used crude noise filtering to suppress the inherent ‘hissiness’ of the source material, but this had the added effect of making them sound duller and less distinct than the original CD issue.

Track listing

CD 1 
 "Devil's Answer" 4:12 - dubbed ("live") studio version 1981
 "Play it Again" 3:12
 "End of the Day" 3:31
 "Tomorrow Night" 4:52 - dubbed ("live") studio version 1981
 "Lost in Space" 5:53
 "Lose Your Mind" 3:36
 "Control of You" 4:49
 "She's My Woman" 3:15
 "Death Walks Behind You" 7:12 - Death Walks Behind You album version; dubbed from LP
 "Sleeping for Years" 5:25 - as above; as above
 "I Can't Take No More" 3:24 - as above; as above

CD 2 
 "Do You Know Who's Looking for You" 3:04
 "Don't Lose Your Mind" 3:36
 "Watch Out!" 4:06
 "I Don't Need You Anymore"  "I Can’t Stand It" 3:49
 "He Did it Again" 4:04
 "The Show" 3:54
 "Start to Live" a.k.a. "Rebel With a Clause" 2:58
 "Living Underground" a.k.a. "Night Living" 3:38
 "End of the Day" 5:25 - full alternate/demo version, incorporating "Moonrise" instrumental 1980
 "Take it for Granted" a.k.a. "It's so Unkind" 4:07 - unreleased track 1979
 "Sleepless Nights" a.k.a. "When You go to Bed" 3:46 - unreleased track 1979
 "Hold it Through the Night" 3:13 - unreleased track 1981
 "No Change by Me" 3:19 - unreleased track 1981
 "Throw Your Life Away" 2:54 - "Do You Know Who's Looking for You?" single B-side

References 

Atomic Rooster compilation albums
1992 compilation albums